Honorary citizen of Belgrade is a title awarded by the leadership of Belgrade on behalf of the city.

Requirements
The title can be awarded to both a citizen of Serbia and any other state, as a politician or statesman, as well as a representative of a non-governmental organization or an artist. A candidate for honorary citizenship of Belgrade must have a contribution to the development of science, art, humanitarian activities, etc., which has helped the development and image of Belgrade, the development of democracy in Serbia and the world. The decision to award the title is made by the City Assembly (Parliament). Candidates are nominated by the City Council or at least 10 councilors.

A person who has received the title of honorary citizen of Belgrade is presented with an official letter on official paper at an official meeting of the Assembly. A citizen of Serbia receives it on City Day, and a representative of another country receives it during their visit to Belgrade.

History

The first to receive this title was General Peko Dapčević on 19 October 1945, who led the liberation of Belgrade in the autumn of 1944. On Yugoslav Youth Day in 1947, the title were given to the head of the Yugoslav Communist Party, Josip Broz Tito, Fyodor Tolbukhin, marshal of the Soviet Union, and Vladimir Zhdanov, general of the Soviet army.

On 19 July 1954 (the year when the title was officially established), for the first time, the leader of a foreign state, the Emperor of Ethiopia, Haile Selassie , became an honorary citizen of Belgrade. Of the foreign leaders after him, the title was awarded to Jawaharlal Nehru , Gamal Abdel Nasser , Norodom Sihanouk , Leonid Brezhnev and others. Despite the warm relations of Josip Broz Tito with a number of leaders of Western European countries, only Elizabeth II, Queen of the United Kingdom, became an honorary citizen of Belgrade during his life (and currently the only woman to be assigned this title). Till 1985, honorary citizens of Belgrade were high foreign officials, who were visiting SFR Yugoslavia. After 1985, the title was not awarded for more than 21 years. The title was reintroduced in 2006. Until 2006, an honorary Belgrade citizen could only become someone who was a senior foreign politician, statesman or military leader. Nelson Mandela received it in 2007.

At the beginning of the 21st century, Bill Gates and Michael Schumacher were nominated as candidates for honorary citizens of Belgrade . Serbian historian Aleksandar Životić explained this by the breakdown of the socialist bloc and globalization, in an era in which society chooses new heroes.

In 2015, Nikita Mikhalkov and Peter Handke are the first artists to become honorary citizens of the Serbian capital.

List of honorary citizens
The list includes people who have been awarded the title of honorary citizen of Belgrade.

See also
List of people from Belgrade
List of honorary citizens of Niš
List of honorary citizens of Novi Sad
List of honorary citizens of Zrenjanin

References 

Belgrade

Belgrade-related lists
Honorary citizens of Belgrade